Södermanland County or Region Sörmland held a regional council election on 9 September 2018 across its nine municipalities. This was part of the 2018 Swedish regional elections and held on the same day as the municipal and general elections.

Results
The number of seats rose from 71 to 79. This meant that both the Social Democrats and the Moderates kept their seat numbers in spite of their vote and seat share falling sizeably. The Social Democrats fell the most, going from 33.3% to 28.7%. The local party Vård för pengarna ended up becoming the largest party in both coastal municipalities of Nyköping and Oxelösund. This was the first time any other party than the Social Democrats had topped the poll in Oxelösund in any election since the location's founding. Even so, commanding vote leads in the interior and in the largest town Eskilstuna led to the Social Democrats being the largest party. The Sweden Democrats gained 13.1% of the popular vote in a large numerical rise, rendering four parties gaining about 4/5 of the seats as the Green Party lost all their four seats.

Municipal results

Percentages

By votes

Images

References

2018
Södermanland